Isabela may refer to:

People with the given name
 Isabela Corona (1913–1993), Mexican actress
 Isabela Garcia (born 1967), Brazilian actress
 Isabela Moraes (born 1980), Brazilian synchronized swimmer
 Isabela de Rosis (1842–1911), Italian noblewoman
 Isabela Moner (born 2001), American actress

Places
 Isabela Island (Galápagos), an island in the Galápagos, Ecuador
 Isabela River, a river in the Dominican Republic
 La Isabela, a town in Puerto Plata provence, Dominican Republic, first European settlement in the New World
 La Isabela International Airport, an airport in the Santo Domingo province, Dominican Republic
 Villa Isabela, a town in the Puerto Plata province, Dominican Republic
 Isabela (province), a province in the Cagayan Valley Region, Luzon, Philippines
 Isabela State University, an educational institution in the province of Isabela
 Isabela, Basilan, a city in the Basilan province, Philippines
 Isabela, Negros Occidental, a municipality in the Negros Occidental province, Philippines
 Isabela, Puerto Rico, a municipality in Puerto Rico
 Isabela de Sagua (or Isabela), a seaside village in Villa Clara Province, Cuba

Other uses
 Isabela oriole, a bird found on Luzon, Philippines
 Isabela (Dragon Age), a character in the Dragon Age media franchise
 Isabela Madrigal, fictional character from the film Encanto

See also 
 Isabel (disambiguation)
 Isabella (disambiguation)
 Isabelle (disambiguation)